Eduardo Aranda (born 28 January 1985 in Asunción) is a Paraguayan footballer who plays for Resistencia Sport Club in the Paraguayan División Intermedia.

Club career
From 2003 to 2005, Aranda formed part of Olimpia Asunción's U20 squad.

After not having a chance with the first team, emigrated to Uruguay to try his luck with Rampla Juniors. In 2006, Aranda joined the club, colleaguing with compatriot Arnaldo Villalba.

He played a season and a half with that team, until he was transferred to Liverpool Montevideo, teaming up with Cameroon footballer Martin Kamga.

On 31 July 2009, he signed a new deal with Uruguays giants Club Nacional de Football. He only remained one season in the giants, then signing with Defensor Sporting.

In mid June 2011, he returned to his country to sign a new contract with his origin club Olimpia. He played a vital role in his team becoming champions of the 2011 Clausura after the club suffered eleven years without a title. After improving a lot during the 2012 season Aranda makes a good 2013 Copa Libertadores

Resistencia
Aranda renounced from Guaireña to join second-tier Resistencia Sport Club, and held the objective of ascending to the Primera División whilst the club was in second place of the second-tier table. Aranda spoke with Carlos Recalde, who previously was his coach at Deportivo Capiatá, and expressed that he wanted to depart Guaireña and see the possibility of playing at Resistencia. He joined Julian Benitez and Rodrigo Burgos in the Resistencia squad.

International career
On 9 June 2012, Aranda made his debut for Paraguay in a 2014 FIFA World Cup qualification match against Bolivia.

Honors
Olimpia
Paraguayan Primera División: 2011 Clausura

References

External links
 
 
 
 JEF United Chiba Profile
 
 Eduardo Aranda at playmakerstats.com

1985 births
Living people
Paraguayan footballers
Paraguayan expatriate footballers
Paraguay international footballers
Rampla Juniors players
Defensor Sporting players
Liverpool F.C. (Montevideo) players
Club Nacional de Football players
Club Olimpia footballers
CR Vasco da Gama players
JEF United Chiba players
Deportivo Santaní players
Deportivo Capiatá players
Cusco FC footballers
Paraguayan Primera División players
Uruguayan Primera División players
Campeonato Brasileiro Série B players
J2 League players
Peruvian Primera División players
2015 Copa América players
Sportspeople from Asunción
Association football midfielders
Expatriate footballers in Brazil
Expatriate footballers in Uruguay
Expatriate footballers in Japan
Expatriate footballers in Peru
Paraguayan expatriate sportspeople in Brazil
Paraguayan expatriate sportspeople in Uruguay
Paraguayan expatriate sportspeople in Japan
Paraguayan expatriate sportspeople in Peru